Jens Brandenburg (born 8 March 1986) is a German politician of the Free Democratic Party (FDP) who has been serving as a member of the Bundestag from the state of Baden-Württemberg since 2017. Since December 2021, he serves as Parliamentary State Secretary to the Federal Minister of Education and Research in the coalition government of Chancellor Olaf Scholz.

Early life and career 
Born in Simmerath, North Rhine-Westphalia, Brandenburg graduated from high school in Monschau in 2005. He then studied political science and economics at the University of Mannheim until 2010, graduating with a Bachelor's and master's degree. From 2010 to 2014 Brandenburg received his doctorate from the Graduate School of Economics and Social Science at the University of Mannheim.

After receiving his doctorate, Brandenburg worked for the Boston Consulting Group from 2014 until 2017. Brandenburg lives with his partner in Kurpfalz.

Political career 
Brandenburg has been a member of the FDP since 2006.

From 2018 until 2021, Brandenburg was member of the Committee for Education, Research and Technology Assessment. During that time, he also served as his parliamentary group's spokesperson for studies, vocational training, lifelong learning and the rights of LSBTI.

In addition to his committee assignments, Brandenburg is part of the German Parliamentary Friendship Group for Relations with the Cono Sur States.

In the negotiations to form a so-called traffic light coalition of the Social Democrats (SPD), the Green Party and the FDP following the 2021 federal elections, Brandenburg led his party's delegation in the working group on education policy; his co-chairs from the other parties were Andreas Stoch and Felix Banaszak.

Other activities 
 Magnus Hirschfeld Foundation, Member of the Board of Trustees (since 2018)

References

External links 
 

  
 Bundestag biography 

1986 births
Living people
Members of the Bundestag for Baden-Württemberg
Members of the Bundestag 2021–2025
Members of the Bundestag 2017–2021
Members of the Bundestag for the Free Democratic Party (Germany)
Gay politicians
LGBT members of the Bundestag